Hyphessobrycon chocoensis is a species of South American tetra, belonging to the family Characidae. It is pale orange in coloration. It has a very thin and dark midline beginning at the base of the caudal fin and fading back to pale orange before it reaches the gills. It is around 4 centimeters (1.6 inches) in length. It is known to inhabit the Telembí River Basin in Colombia. This fish is benthopelagic, meaning that it resides away from the surface of the water.

General references 
 Hyphessobrycon chocoensis García-Alzate, Román-Valencia & Taphorn, 2013
 Image: Hyphessobrycon chocoensis holotype, IUQ 3035, 37.1 mm SL (scale = 1 cm). 
 A new species of Hyphessobrycon (Characiformes: Characidae) from the Telembi River drainage, Southern Pacific slope of Colombia

Characidae
Taxa named by Carlos A. García-Alzate, 
Taxa named by Cesar Román-Valencia
Fish described in 2013